The following are the national records in athletics in Iran maintained by Athletic Federation of Islamic Republic of Iran (AAFIRI).

Outdoor

Key to tables:

Men

Women

Indoor

Men

Women

Notes
 On 26 July 2015 Mohammad Hossein Abareghi run a 20.47 at the Guzman Kosanov Memorial which was later annulled due to doping violation.
 Record set during pentathlon competition.
 On 28 May 2016 Ayoub Arokhi had a throw of 77.06 metres at the Tehran Grand Prix which was later annulled due to irregular implement.

References
General
  Iranian Athletics Records – Men Outdoor 28 June 2021 updated
  Iranian Athletics Records – Women Outdoor 16 September 2021 updated
  Iranian Athletics Records – Men Indoor 14 February 2021 updated
  Iranian Athletics Records – Women Indoor 1 March 2021 updated
 17th World Championships In Athletics: IAAF Statistics Handbook. Doha 2019
 14th IAAF World Indoor Championships In Athletics: IAAF Statistics Handbook. Istanbul 2012, Pages 253–268
 14th IAAF World Indoor Championships In Athletics: IAAF Statistics Handbook. Istanbul 2012, Pages 298–314
Specific

External links
  AAFIRI web site
  Tehran Athletic

Iran
Records
Athletics
Athletics